Valentin Dasch  (1 May 1930 - 2 August 1981) was a German politician, representative of the Christian Social Union of Bavaria.

He was a member of the Landtag of Bavaria from 1966 to 1969 and from 1969 to 1972 a member of the national Bundestag.

See also
List of Bavarian Christian Social Union politicians

References

Christian Social Union in Bavaria politicians
1930 births
1981 deaths
Place of birth missing
Place of death missing